The dorsal longitudinal fasciculus (DLF) (not to be confused with the medial longitudinal fasciculus, nor the superior longitudinal fasciculus) is a longitudinal tract interconnecting the posterior hypothalamus, and the inferior medulla oblongata. It contains both ascending tracts and descending tracts, and serves to link the forebrain, and the visceral autonomic centres of the lower brainstem. It conveys both visceral motor signals, and sensory signals.

Anatomy 
The DLF is periventricular longitudinal a white matter fiber tract located within the periaqueductal gray matter of the dorsal tegmentum of the brainstem. The tract consists of a diffuse pathway comprising ascending visceral sensory axons and descending hypothalamic axons; it conveys both visceral motor signals and sensory signals.

Ascending fibers 
The ascending tract of the DLF originates in the nuclei of the reticular formation; its fibers synapse in the hypothalamus. It conveys visceral information to the brain.

Brainstem afferents in DLF include fibers coming from the parabrachial area, which conveys taste and general visceral sensation to the hypothalamus from the nucleus of the tractus solitarius in the medulla. Afferents distribute to the posterior nucleus and periventricular nuclei of the hypothalamus.

Descending fibers 
The descending portion of the DLF originates in the hypothalamus. These fibers then descend through the brain stem periaqueductal gray matter along the base of the fourth ventricle. These fibers continue on into the spinal cord where they synapse with preganglionic autonomic neurons.

Hypothalamic efferents in DLF arise from the paraventricular nucleus, supraoptic nucleus and periventricular nucleus, and send information to multiple areas, including:
1) midbrain central gray for pain modulation,
2) the medullary autonomic centers for heart rate, blood pressure, and respiration,
3) the ventral tegmental area,
4) brainstem parasympathetic nuclei (dorsal motor nucleus of the Vagus and salivatory nuclei for the eyes),
5) thoraco-lumbar preganglionic sympathetic neurons, and
6) lumbo-sacral preganglionic parasympathetic neurons.

Note that at least some of the output from the hypothalamus lies outside of the DLF, within a set of Descending Hypothalamic Fibers running next to the spinothalamic tract; lesions of this area canonically lead to ipsilateral Horner's syndrome.

References

https://web.archive.org/web/20061111064632/http://www.sylvius.com/index/d/dorsal_longitudinal_fasciculus.html

External links
 NIF Search - Dorsal longitudinal fasciculus via the Neuroscience Information Framework

Hypothalamus
Brainstem